Parliamentary elections were held in the People's Republic of the Congo on 24 June 1973, concurrent with a constitutional referendum. The country was a one-party state at the time, with the Congolese Party of Labour as the sole legal party. As such, it won all 115 seats in the People's National Assembly. Voter turnout was 83.2%.

Results

References

Elections in the Republic of the Congo
Congo
1973 in the Republic of the Congo
One-party elections